Harvey Mervin Lifset (March 6, 1916 – May 21, 2005) was an American lawyer and politician from New York.

Life
He was born on March 6, 1916, in Schenectady, New York, the son of Abram Lifset and Rose (Barish) Lifset. He attended Nott Terrace High School. He graduated A.B. from Union College in 1937, and LL.B. from Albany Law School in 1940. He was admitted to the bar in 1940. In May 1942, he married Violet L. Rubin, and they had two sons. During World War II he served in the U.S. Army, and finished the war as a major of the 82nd Airborne Division. He was awarded the Bronze Star Medal, six battle stars, and an Arrowhead device. Later he was promoted to colonel of the Army Reserve. In 1946, he began to practice law in Albany.

Lifset was a member of the New York State Assembly from 1957 to 1968, sitting in the 171st, 172nd, 173rd, 174th, 175th, 176th and 177th New York State Legislatures. He was Chairman of the Committee on Affairs of Cities in 1965, and Chairman of the Committee on Ways and Means from 1966 to 1968.

He died on May 21, 2005, in the Daughters of Sarah Nursing Home in Albany, New York.

Sources

1916 births
2005 deaths
People from Loudonville, New York
Democratic Party members of the New York State Assembly
Politicians from Schenectady, New York
Politicians from Albany, New York
Union College (New York) alumni
Albany Law School alumni
United States Army officers
Jewish American state legislators in New York (state)
20th-century American politicians
Lawyers from Albany, New York
Military personnel from Schenectady, New York
20th-century American lawyers
20th-century American Jews
21st-century American Jews